Matt Riser is an American college baseball coach, currently serving as head coach of the Southeastern Louisiana Lions baseball program. He was named to that position prior to the 2014 season.

He grew up in Picayune, Mississippi where he played baseball with Major League Baseball player Rhyne Hughes.  After a playing career at Pearl River Community College and Tulane and an appearance in the 2005 College World Series, Riser coached for one season as an assistant with the Green Wave under Rick Jones.  He then moved to Southeastern Louisiana for six seasons.  After head coach Jay Artigues resigned to become athletic director following the 2013 season, Riser was named interim head coach.  Riser was made permanent on January 24, 2014, the first day of spring practice.

Head coaching record
Below is a table of Riser's yearly records as an NCAA head baseball coach.

See also
List of current NCAA Division I baseball coaches

References

External links
Southeastern Louisiana Lions bio

Living people
1984 births
Baseball coaches from Mississippi
Pearl River Wildcats baseball players
Southeastern Louisiana Lions baseball coaches
Tulane Green Wave baseball coaches
Tulane Green Wave baseball players
People from Picayune, Mississippi